Marlee is a female given name. Notable persons with this name include:

Marlee Matlin (born 1965), American actress
Marlee Ranacher, Australian author
Marlee Scott (born 1986), Canadian country music singer now living in the United States

See also
Marley (disambiguation)

Feminine given names